Oracle Database provides information about all of the tables, views, columns, and procedures in a database. This information about information is known as metadata. It is stored in two locations: data dictionary tables (accessed via built-in views) and a metadata registry.

Other relational database management systems support an ANSI-standard equivalent called information schema.

Views for metadata
The total number of these views depends on the Oracle version, but is in a 1000 range.

The main built-in views accessing Oracle RDBMS data dictionary tables are few, and are as follows:
 ALL_OBJECTS – list of all objects in the current database that are accessible to the current user;
 ALL_TABLES – list of all tables in the current database that are accessible to the current user;
 ALL_VIEWS – list of all views in the current database that are accessible to the current user;
 ALL_TAB_COLUMNS – list of all columns in the database that are accessible to the current user;
 ALL_ARGUMENTS – lists the arguments of functions and procedures that are accessible to the current user;
 ALL_ERRORS – lists descriptions of errors on all stored objects (views, procedures, functions, packages, and package bodies) that are accessible to the current user;
 ALL_OBJECT_SIZE – included for backward compatibility with Oracle version 5;
 ALL_PROCEDURES – (from Oracle 9 onwards) lists all functions and procedures (along with associated properties) that are accessible to the current user;
 ALL_SOURCE – describes the text (i.e. PL/SQL) source of the stored objects accessible to the current user;
 ALL_TRIGGERS – list all the triggers accessible to the current user.

In addition there are equivalent views prefixed "USER_" which show only the objects owned by the current user (i.e. a more restricted view of metadata) and prefixed "DBA_" which show all objects in the database (i.e. an unrestricted global view of metadata for the database instance). Naturally the access to "DBA_" metadata views requires specific privileges.

Example 1: finding tables 
Find all Tables that have PATTERN in the table name

  SELECT Owner AS Schema_Name, Table_Name
  FROM   All_Tables
  WHERE  Table_Name LIKE '%PATTERN%'
  ORDER  BY Owner, Table_Name;

Example 2: finding columns 
Find all tables that have at least one column that matches a specific PATTERN in the column name

  SELECT Owner AS Schema_Name, Table_Name, Column_Name
  FROM   All_Tab_Columns
  WHERE  Column_Name LIKE '%PATTERN%'
  ORDER  BY 1,2,3;

Example 3: counting rows of columns 
Estimate a total number of rows in all tables containing a column name that matches PATTERN (this is SQL*Plus specific script)

  COLUMN DUMMY NOPRINT
  COMPUTE SUM OF NUM_ROWS ON DUMMY
  BREAK ON DUMMY
  SELECT
   NULL DUMMY,
   T.TABLE_NAME,
   C.COLUMN_NAME,
   T.NUM_ROWS
  FROM
   ALL_TABLES T,
   ALL_TAB_COLUMNS C
  WHERE
   T.TABLE_NAME = C.TABLE_NAME
   AND C.COLUMN_NAME LIKE '%PATTERN%'
   AND T.OWNER = C.OWNER
  ORDER BY T.TABLE_NAME;
Note that NUM_ROWS records the number of rows which were in a table when (and if) it was last analyzed. This will most likely deviate from the actual number of rows currently in the table.

Example 4: finding view columns 
Find view columns

SELECT TABLE_NAME,
    column_name,
    decode(c.DATA_TYPE,
       'VARCHAR2',
       c.DATA_TYPE || '(' || c.DATA_LENGTH || ')',
       'NUMBER',
       DECODE(c.data_precision, 
           NULL, 
           c.DATA_TYPE, 
           0, 
                c.DATA_TYPE, 
           c.DATA_TYPE || '(' || c.data_precision || DECODE(c.data_scale, 
                                   NULL, 
                                   ')', 
                                   0, 
                                   ')' , 
                                   ', ' || c.data_scale || ')')),
       c.DATA_TYPE) data_type
 FROM cols c, obj o
 WHERE c.TABLE_NAME = o.object_name
   AND o.object_type = 'VIEW'   
   AND c.table_name LIKE '%PATTERN%'
   ORDER BY c.table_name, c.column_id;
Warning: This is incomplete with respect to multiple datatypes including char, varchar and timestamp and uses extremely old, deprecated dictionary views, back to oracle 5.

Use of underscore in table and column names
The underscore is a special SQL pattern match to a single character and should be escaped if you are in fact looking for an underscore character in the LIKE clause of a query.

Just add the following after a LIKE statement:

  ESCAPE '_'

And then each literal underscore should be a double underscore: __

Example

  LIKE '%__G' ESCAPE '_'

Oracle Metadata Registry
The Oracle product Oracle Enterprise Metadata Manager (EMM) is an ISO/IEC 11179 compatible metadata registry. It stores administered metadata in a consistent format that can be used for metadata publishing. In January 2006, EMM was available only through Oracle consulting services.

See also
 Information schema
 Metadata

References

External links
 article on Oracle Metadata

Metadata
Metadata
Articles with example SQL code